Fidel: The Untold Story is a documentary released in 2001 by Estela Bravo.

The film features interviews with:
Phillip Agee
Muhammad Ali
Harry Belafonte
Ramsey Clark
Angela Davis
Elián González
Nelson Mandela
Gabriel García Márquez
Ted Turner
Alice Walker

External links

2001 films
Documentary films about Fidel Castro
2001 documentary films
American documentary films
2000s English-language films
2000s American films